Vitaly Gruşac (born 11 September 1977) is a Moldovan Olympic medal boxer from Grimancauti village (a well-known Moldavian boxing centre). He competed in the Welterweight division at the 2000 Summer Olympics. Gruşac qualified for the 2004 Summer Olympics by taking second place at the 4th AIBA European 2004 Olympic Qualifying Tournament in Baku, Azerbaijan.

Olympic 2000 results  

Round of 32: Saturday, September 16, 2000. Defeated Aregawi Tsegasellase (Ethiopia) walkover
Round of 16: Thursday, September 21, 2000. Defeated Sherzod Husanov (Uzbekistan) 13-7
Quarter-finals: Tuesday, September 26, 2000. Defeated Bülent Ulusoy (Turkey) 19-10
Semi-finals: Thursday, September 28, 2000. Lost to Sergey Dotsenko (Ukraine) 8-17

References

Sports Reference

1977 births
Living people
Moldovan male boxers
Boxers at the 2000 Summer Olympics
Boxers at the 2004 Summer Olympics
Boxers at the 2008 Summer Olympics
Olympic boxers of Moldova
Olympic bronze medalists for Moldova
Olympic medalists in boxing
Medalists at the 2000 Summer Olympics
Welterweight boxers